The year 1898 in archaeology involved some significant excavations.

Explorations
 Exploration of the site of Assur by German archaeologists begins.

Excavations
 J. E. Quibell excavates the royal residences of various early Egyptian kings at Hierakonpolis in Upper Egypt.
 Excavations at Bremetennacum (Ribchester), Lancashire, England (1898–9).

Finds
 March - Victor Loret discovers Amenhotep II's mummy in his KV35 tomb in Egypt's Valley of the Kings within the original sarcophagus, together with a mummy cache containing several New Kingdom Pharaohs including Thutmose IV, Seti II and Ramesses III, IV and VI.
 Summer - The Bleasdale Circle, a Bronze Age timber and earthwork in Lancashire, England, is discovered by Thomas Kelsall.
 The Withypool Stone Circle (late Neolithic/early Bronze Age) on Exmoor, England, is discovered accidentally by Archibald Hamilton.
 The Narmer Palette is found by J. E. Quibell while excavating the royal residences of various early Egyptian kings at Hierakonpolis in Upper Egypt.
 The site of Karakorum is identified as the former Mongol capital by Nikolai Yadrintsev, who discovers the Orkhon script during the same expedition.
 Willie Peppé, excavating a stupa at Piprahwa Kot, discovers ashes claimed to be of Gautama Buddha.
 Purported finding of the Kensington Runestone in Minnesota.

Births
 22 August – Jaroslav Černý, Czech-born Egyptologist (d. 1970).
 14 September – Ernest Nash, born Ernst Nathan, German-born student of Roman architecture and pioneer of archaeological photography (d. 1974).
 31 December – J. Eric S. Thompson, English archaeologist, student of the Maya civilization (d. 1975).

Deaths
 21 October – Marianne Brocklehurst, English Egyptological traveller and expedition sponsor (b. 1832).

See also
 List of years in archaeology
 1897 in archaeology
 1899 in archaeology

References

Archaeology, 1898 In
Archaeology by year
1890s in science
Archaeology, 1898 In